This is a list of diseases starting with the letter "U".

Ud–Up
 UDP-galactose-4-epimerase deficiency
 Uhl anomaly
 Ulbright–Hodes syndrome
 Ulcerative colitis
 Ulerythema ophryogenesis
 Ulna and fibula absence with severe limb deficit
 Ulna hypoplasia mental retardation
 Ulna metaphyseal dysplasia syndrome
 Ulnar hypoplasia lobster claw deformity of feet
 Umbilical cord ulceration intestinal atresia
 Uncombable hair syndrome
 Uncontrolled nipple elongation
 Uniparental disomy of 11
 Uniparental disomy of 13
 Uniparental disomy of 14
 Uniparental disomy of 2
 Uniparental disomy of 6
 Uniparental disomy
 Unna–Politzer nevus
 Unna's seborrhoeic eczema
 Unverricht–Lundborg disease
 Upington disease
 Upper limb defect eye and ear abnormalities
 Upton–Young syndrome

Ur
 Urachal cancer
 Urachal cyst
 Urbach–Wiethe disease
 Urban–Rogers–Meyer syndrome
 Urban–Schosser–Spohn syndrome
 Urea cycle enzymopathies
 Uremia
 Urethral obstruction sequence
 Uridine monophosphate synthetase deficiency
 Urinary calculi
 Urinary tract neoplasm
 Urioste–Martinez–Frias syndrome
 Urocanase deficiency
 Urogenital adysplasia
 Urophathy distal obstructive polydactyly
 Urticaria pigmentosa
 Urticaria
 Urticaria-deafness-amyloidosis

Us–Uv
 Usher syndrome, type 1C
 Usher syndrome, type 1D
 Usher syndrome, type 1E
 Usher syndrome, type 2A
 Usher syndrome, type 2B
 Usher syndrome, type 2C
 Usher syndrome, type 3
 Usher syndrome, type IA
 Usher syndrome, type IB
 Usher syndrome
 Uveal diseases
 Uveitis, anterior
 Uveitis, posterior
 Uveitis

U